Druck is a Polish coat of arms. It was used by several szlachta (noble) families under the Polish–Lithuanian Commonwealth.

History
The Druck coat of arms goes back to ancient times. It was the coat of arms of the Princely House of Drucki and its successors.

Blazon

Notable bearers
Notable bearers of this coat of arms include:
 Demetriusz I Starszy

See also
 Polish heraldry
 Heraldry
 Coat of arms

Belarusian coats of arms
Polish coats of arms
Trubetskoy family
Coats of arms with swords
Coats of arms with moons
Coats of arms with crowns